Cunard is a surname. Notable people with the surname include:

Grace Cunard (1893–1967), American silent film actress
Maud Cunard (1872–1948), American-born London hostess
Nancy Cunard (1896–1965), English writer, editor, and publisher
Samuel Cunard (1787–1865), British shipping magnate